The Defence of the Realm Act 1798  was an Act passed by the Parliament of Great Britain "to enable His Majesty more effectually to provide for the Defence and Security of the Realm during the present War, and for indemnifying Persons who may suffer in their Property by such Measures as may be necessary for that Purpose".

See also
 Defence of the Realm Act 1803 
 Defence of the Realm Act 1806 
 Defence of the Realm Act 1914

References

Great Britain Acts of Parliament 1798
United Kingdom military law